Metaphysics is the second album by Duncan Avoid.

Track listing

"Awakening" – 2:03
"Auditory Arms" – 3:36
"Parallel Grounds" – 4:07
"Systemic Ressentiment" – 5:24
"Lucid [Down the Rabbit Hole]" – 5:31
"Attention Deficit Disorder" – 7:51
"Consciousness Creeping" – 3:08
"S.H.I.F.I." – 5:36
"Convergence" – 3:44
"Auditory Arms – 4:25 (remixed by C-Drik)
"Cartesian Doubt" – 1:50
"Convergence" – 4:21 (remixed by Subskan)
"Plastone Ground" – 2:28 (remixed by Kotra)
"Rue de la Fée Verte" – 3:42

Recognition
Metaphysics received widespread critical acclaim upon its initial release, and was named greatest album of the year by Xanopticon at Igloo Magazine.

References

2004 albums